N-(2-Carboxyethyl)iminodiacetic acid or β-ADA (β-alanine diacetate) is a tetradentate complexing agent which forms stable 1:1 chelate complexes with cations having a charge number of at least +2, e.g. the "hard water forming" cations Ca2+ or Mg2+. N-(2-Carboxyethyl)iminodiacetic acid should not be confused with α-Alaninediacetic acid, also known as methylglycinediacetic acid (MGDA) or α-ADA. Alkaline earth and heavy metal complexes of both, α-ADA and β-ADA are biodegradable (in contrast to chelate complexes with conventional complexing agents such as EDTA).

Production 
The first synthesis of N-(2-carboxyethyl)iminodiacetic acid from β-alanine and monochloroacetic acid was reported by Gerold Schwarzenbach in 1949.

The double cyanomethylation of β-alanine as starting material provides with methanal and alkali cyanides and subsequent hydrolysis of the intermediately formed bis-methyl cyanides followed by acidification with mineral acids β-ADA (N-(2-carboxyethyl)iminodiacetic acid) in yields of only 80%, but very high purity of 99.8%.

The cyanoethylation of iminodiacetic acid with 2-propenenitrile by a Michael addition provides the ethyl cyano compound, which produces after alkaline hydrolysis and acidification β-ADA with  a total yield of 93.6% and purity of 99.9% .

In the analogue reaction with acrylic acid esters, 99.9% β-ADA are obtained after acidification in a total yield of 97.6%.

The most direct route is via the Michael addition of acrylic acid to iminodiacetic acid, which produces the trisodium salt of β-ADA in 97% yield and 99.2% purity. The conversion to β-ADA itself is not described in this patent specification.

The most economical synthesis route is based on iminodiacetic acid, which is easily accessible by oxidizing diethanolamine and serves as a key raw material for the herbicide glyphosate.

Properties 
N-(2-Carboxyethyl)iminodiacetic acid is a colourless solid that was shown to be very well degradable in sewage plant simulations (98% after eight weeks) and to be exceptionally low in toxicity. Elsewhere, the poor microbial degradability and adsorbability of β-ADA is pointed out. The contradictory assessment of the degradability of β-ADA, the weaker complex formation compared to the (rapidly biodegradable) methylglycine diacetic acid (MGDA, Trilon M) and the lower stability in wide temperature and pH ranges have substantially contributed to the breakthrough of MGDA as the most suitable substitute for EDTA.

Use 
Like other complexing agents from the class of aminopolycarboxylic acids, N-(2-carboxyethyl)iminodiacetic acid is used in water softening, in detergents and cleaning agents, in electroplating, cosmetics, paper and textile production. This is based on  its ability to form stable chelate complexes with polyvalent ions, in particular the water hardness formers Ca2+ and Mg2+, as well as transition and heavy metal ions, such as Fe3+, Mn2+, Cu2+, etc.

References 

Amino acids
Tricarboxylic acids